Gary McCormick is a New Zealand poet, radio and television personality, debater and raconteur.

McCormick began writing poetry in 1968. His published volumes are Gypsies (with Jon Benson, 1974), Naked and Nameless (1976), Poems for the Red Engine (1978), Poems by Request (1979), Scarlet Letters (1980), Zephyr (1982) and Lost at Sea (1995). He also wrote Performance—A Guide to the Performing Arts in New Zealand for the Department of Internal Affairs (1979) and the satiric secret diary of Jacques Chirac, Honey, I blew up the Atoll (with Scott Wilson, 1995).  He is also a long-time collaborator and friend of Sam Hunt.

Invited to front a television documentary Raglan by the Sea, his offbeat, amusing style won his first television outing the Documentary of the Year award. He went on to present a successful documentary series called Heartland where Gary documented the lives of the locals in small towns across New Zealand. Notable stories included the lovable girl from Wainuiomata, called Chloe Reeves, who became a national sensation overnight, with her tiger slippers and interesting lifestyle. McCormick also featured in advertisements for hardware retailer Mitre 10 during the late 1980s and early 1990s.

In 1990, McCormick hosted the New Zealand Labour Party's election broadcast, interviewing Prime Minister Mike Moore and his wife Yvonne. 

In 1997, he was named New Zealand Entertainer of the Year.

In 2001, he appeared on a celebrity special of The Weakest Link.

He has held a variety of other positions - a gardener for Porirua Hospital, a Merry-go-round operator and MCing the Sweetwaters Music Festival.

McCormick is currently a breakfast radio co-host with The Breakfast Club on More FM. The show is broadcast from Christchurch and airs nationwide.

See also
 List of New Zealand television personalities

References

1951 births
Living people
New Zealand columnists
New Zealand television presenters
New Zealand radio presenters
People from Upper Hutt
People educated at Mana College
More FM